Isogrid is a type of partially hollowed-out structure formed usually from a single metal plate (or face sheet) with triangular integral stiffening ribs (often called stringers). It was patented by McDonnell Douglas (now part of Boeing).
It is extremely light and stiff. Compared to other materials, it is expensive to manufacture, and so it is restricted to spaceflight applications and some particularly critical parts of more general aerospace use.

Theory and design 

Isogrid structures are related to sandwich-structured composite panels; both can be modeled using sandwich theory, which describes structures with separated, stiff face sheets and a lighter interconnecting layer.  Isogrids are manufactured from single sheets of material and with large-scale triangular openings, and an open pattern to the flanges, compared to closed sheets and foam or honeycomb structures for the sandwich-composite structures.

Isogrid structures are constituted by a thin skin reinforced with a lattice structure. Such structures are adopted in the aeronautical industry since they present both structural resistance and lightness.

The triangular pattern is very efficient because it retains rigidity while saving material and therefore weight. The term isogrid is used because the structure acts like an isotropic material, with equal properties measured in any direction, and grid, referring to the sheet and stiffeners structure.

A similar variant is the Orthogrid (sometimes called a waffle grid), which uses rectangular rather than triangular openings.  This is not isotropic (has different properties from different angles), but matches many use cases well and is easier to manufacture.

Traditionally, the equilateral triangle pattern was used because it was amenable to simplified analysis.
 Since the equilateral triangle pattern has isotropic strength characteristics (no preferential direction), it was named isogrid.

Manufacturing 
The stiffeners of an isogrid are generally machined from one face of a single sheet of material such as aluminum with a CNC milling machine. A thickness less than 0.040 in. (1.0 millimeter) might require chemical milling processes.

A major push has been made toward additive manufacturing techniques due to a decrease in overall material and production costs and high efficiency and accuracy while providing control over parameters like porosity. Also, the ease of prototype manufacturing for testing purposes has made a huge contribution.

Composite isogrids are rib-skin configurations, where at least a part of the rib is a different material from the skin, the composite assembled by various manual or automated processes.  
This can give extremely high strength-weight ratios.

Uses 

Isogrid panels form self-stiffened structures where low weight, stiffness, strength and damage tolerance are important, such as in aircraft or space vehicles. 
Aerospace isogrid structures include payload shrouds and boosters, which must support the full weight of upper stages and payloads under high G loads.  Their open configuration with a single, sealed sheet facing the outside makes them especially useful for propellant tanks for rockets, where sealing the propellant in, but allowing it to drain in use or maintenance are necessary features.

Some spacecraft and launch vehicles which use isogrid structures include:
 Delta families
 Atlas families
 Skylab spacestation Orbital Workshop module
 SLS Core Stage
 CST-100 Starliner
 Spacex Crew Dragon
 Orthogrids (Waffle grids with a square pattern) were used in the Saturn rocket tanks, due to the lower cost and ease of manufacture
 Orthogrids are also planned for the Vulcan rocket.

References

External links 
 Isogrid Plate Modeling, Dr Wiliam Case, 1997
 Isogrid Design Handbook, NASA CR-124075, McDonnell Douglas, 1973
 Advanced Grid Stiffened Composite Structures 
  Isogrid - Shell Structures Tools, 1990 
 Quarter Isogrid used in Surfboard Construction

Components
Aerospace materials